The Hamburger Pokal is an annual football cup competition, shortly known as Hamburg pokal, held by the  since 1982. For sponsorship reasons, the official name of the competition is ODDSET-Pokal. It is one of the 21 regional cup competitions in Germany and a qualifying competition for the German Cup, with the winner of the competition being automatically qualified for the first round of the German Cup in the following season.

The record winners of the competition are FC St. Pauli, with seven titles to their name, including three won by their reserve team, FC St. Pauli II.

An earlier competition was held from 1954 but lasted for only two editions. In the 1972–73 season, once more a cup competition was held. The current competition however dates from 1982.

Mode
The competition is open for all member clubs of the Hamburg FA from the 3. Liga (although no team from Hamburg currently plays in this division) to the lowest division, Kreisklasse B (10th tier). Reserve teams are not permitted to compete anymore. Regardless of which club has been drawn first, clubs from a lower league will always have home advantage when playing a club from a higher league. In case of a draw after regular time, extra time is played followed by a penalty shoot out should the game not be decided by then.  The cup winner automatically qualifies for the first round of the German Cup.

Winners
The winners of the competition:

 ‡ Won by reserve team.

References

Sources
Deutschlands Fußball in Zahlen,  An annual publication with tables and results from the Bundesliga to Verbandsliga/Landesliga, publisher: DSFS

External links
HFV – Hamburg Football Association 
 Official DFB results website

Football cup competitions in Germany
Football competitions in Hamburg
Recurring sporting events established in 1982
1982 establishments in West Germany